Lyne Poirier (born June 16, 1968 in Port-Cartier, Quebec) is a retired judoka from Canada, who won the bronze medal in the women's extra-lightweight (– 48 kg) competition at the 1987 Pan American Games. She represented her native country at the 1992 Summer Olympics in Barcelona, Spain. In 1986, she won the bronze medal in the 48kg weight category at the judo demonstration sport event as part of the 1986 Commonwealth Games.

See also
Judo in Quebec
Judo in Canada
List of Canadian judoka

References

 Profile

1968 births
Living people
Canadian female judoka
Judoka at the 1992 Summer Olympics
Olympic judoka of Canada
Sportspeople from Quebec
People from Côte-Nord
Pan American Games bronze medalists for Canada
Pan American Games medalists in judo
Judoka at the 1987 Pan American Games
Medalists at the 1987 Pan American Games